John Samuel Willes-Johnson (3 July 1793 – 25 July 1863) was a British Conservative Party politician and naval officer.

Family
Willes-Johnson was born in  South Stoke, Somerset to Charles Johnson and Mary Willes, daughter of the Archdeacon of Wells, William Willes. He married Elizabeth de Windt, daughter of John de Windt, in Paris, in 1821, and they had one child: Elizabeth Sarah Johnson (1825–1870).

After Elizabeth's death in 1842, he remarried to Joanna Burn Smeeton in 1849, but she died five years later in 1854.

Willes-Johnson again remarried in 1858, this time to Margaret Ann Pugh, daughter of David Pugh and Ann née Vaughan, and they had one child: Maud Felicia Frances Ann Johnson (1862–1919).. He died at 'Westhill' in Highworth and was buried at Hannington.

Naval career
Entering the navy in 1807, Willes-Johnson became a first class volunteer serving on the Vestal under Captain Edwards Lloyd Graham for two years at Home and Newfoundland stations. Becoming a master's mate in 1809, he was then placed in charge of the merchantman Fortitude, deploying the ship at Lisbon and Cadiz. During his travels, he succeeded in a ruse de guerre, causing an enemy's armed vessel to sheer off despite not possessing a gun on board on the ship.

Willes-Johnson then returned to England, where his arrival was received for three months on the Port Mahon sloop captained by Villiers Francis Hatton. In August 1810, he returned to the seas with Graham on the Pallas, heading for the coast of Norway where he aided in the capture of four Danish privateers and several merchantmen.

Willes-Johnson and Graham then sailed together on the Southampton and Alcmène, the latter of which he went on to the Adriatic Sea where he was involved in a number of boat affairs. One such occasion in 1812 included capturing a Franco-Venetian trabaccolo, including four guns and 30 men, near Lessina Island after a conflict in which many of the enemy's crew were killed, while just four British were slain.

Leaving the Alcmène in 1813, he joined the Pylades sloop with Captain James Erskine Wemyss, before he then became acting-Lieutenant of the Caledonia bearing the flag of the late Lord Exmouth. Willes-Johnson then went on half-pay in 1814, before returning to full pay in 1815. After this he sailed with the Boyne, visiting Naples, Marseille and the Barbary States, and Queen Charlotte, on which he participated in the bombardment of Algiers.

He then had a short further period of half-pay, before being nominated in 1817 to be Flag-Lieutenant to the Impregnable at Plymouth where he remained until promoted to Commander in 1821.

Then, in 1835, he joined Her Majesty's Coastguard for 3 years; and in 1841, he commanded the Wolverine on its voyage to China where he arrived towards the end of the First Opium War. Retiring from active service in 1842, he was made Captain Post in 1847, and a little Captain before retiring altogether in 1847.

Writing
Willes-Johnson also wrote at least one literary work — A Journal of a Tour through parts of France, Italy and Switzerland, in the years 1823-4 — published in 1827.

Political career
Willes-Johnson was elected MP for Montgomery at a by-election in 1861, caused by the death of David Pugh, and held the seat until his own death in 1863.

References

External links
 

Conservative Party (UK) MPs for Welsh constituencies
UK MPs 1859–1865
1793 births
1863 deaths
Royal Navy officers
Royal Navy personnel of the Bombardment of Algiers (1816)
Military personnel from Somerset
People from Bath and North East Somerset